Mazrek may refer to several places in Albania:

Mazrek, Shkodër, a village in the municipality of Shkodër
 Church ruins, Mazrek, a cultural monument
Mazrek, Gramsh, a village in the municipality of Gramsh
Mazrek, Tirana, a village in the municipality of Tirana